Witch at Court is a 2017 South Korean television series starring Jung Ryeo-won and Yoon Hyun-min. It aired from October 9 to November 28, 2017 on KBS2's Mondays and Tuesdays at 22:00 (KST) time slot.

Synopsis
A materialistic female prosecutor who does not hesitate to use personal attacks, fabricate evidence, and incite perjury in order to win her case is assigned to special task force for sex crimes. A newbie prosecutor also joins the task force, and together they solve crimes with a grudging chemistry.

Cast

Main
 Jung Ryeo-won as Ma Yi-deum
 Roh Jeong-eui as teen Ma Yi-deum
 Lee Re as child Ma Yi-deum
 She is an ace prosecutor with experience in all four of district prosecutors' office in Seoul. She walks a fine line between legal and illegal investigation. She does not hesitate to use personal attacks, fabricate evidence and incite perjury in order to win her case. That being said, she is egoistic and ill-tempered. In the most conservative organization in Korea, she has been struggling to rise from humble beginnings. Then she gets caught up in a case and is assigned to the special task force for child sex crimes, the most undesired team in the organization.
 Yoon Hyun-min as Yeo Jin-wook
 Ji Min-hyuk as young Jin-wook
 He is a newbie prosecutor who graduated from law school at the top of his class. He takes no interest in promotion, success and office politics. He used to be a pediatric psychiatrist, so he is able to distinguish truth and falsehood by finding the subtle nuance and hidden clues in people's testimony, which is a useful ability for solving sex crimes, which always lack physical evidence. At first, he is not fond of Yi-deum, who pursues power without reserve, but when he learns about her painful past, he holds out his hand to her and protects her.
 Jun Kwang-ryul as Jo Gap-soo
 As his father was a left-wing activist under the right-wing government, he was not able to become a prosecutor. Instead, he became a policeman. Whenever he had a chance of getting promoted, his father's record would always drag him down, so he accused innocent people as communists to show his loyalty for the government. Yet, he holds no regret or shame for the terrible things he's done. After retiring as a chief officer, he is elected as a member of the National Assembly. He is a member of the advisory board of a law firm, and he runs for the mayor of Yeong-pa city.
 Kim Yeo-jin as Min Ji-sook
 She is the chief prosecutor of the special task force for sex crimes against children and women. She created the task force herself to help the victims more efficiently. 20 years ago, she investigated the sexual torture case of Superintendent Jo Gap-soo. She desperately wanted to punish him but failed due to lack of evidence. After 20 years, she is still fighting against Jo Gap-soo's law firm at the court.

Supporting

Department for Women's Crime Division
 Jun Ik-ryung as Jang Eun-jung
 Choi Ri as Seo Yoo-ri
 Kim Jae-hwa as Son Mi-young
 Yoon Kyung-ho as Goo Seok-chan

Brother Law Firm
 Heo Sung-tae as Baek Sang-ho
 Kim Min-seo as Heo Yoon-kyung, an ace lawyer who does anything to win
 Baek Chul-min as Ahn Tae-kyu

Others
 Lee Il-hwa as Kwak Young-sil, Yi-deum's mother
 Song Chae-yoon as Jang Yoo-mi
 Jo Woo-ri as Jin Yeon-hee
 Park Doo-shik as Kim Dong-shik	
 Jung In-seo as Yoon Ah-reum	
 Kim Kwon as Baek Min-ho
 Kim Ji-eun as Chairman Ahn's secretary
 Im Kang-sung as Yoon Min-joo
 Jeon Bae-soo as Oh Soo-cheol
 Jung Jae-kwang as Prosecutor Yun

Production
 The series is formerly known as Don't Trust Her.
 Filming started in early September 2017.
 The series is produced by iWill Media, of which founder and CEO Kim Jong-shik is a former drama production director for KBS.

Ratings

Awards and nominations

References

External links
  
 
 
 

Korean Broadcasting System television dramas
Korean-language television shows
2017 South Korean television series debuts
2017 South Korean television series endings
South Korean legal television series
South Korean romance television series
Television series by IWill Media